Justin Rovegno (born 17 July 1989) is a Gibraltarian footballer who last played for Gibraltar Second Division side Boca Gibraltar and the Gibraltar national team. Mainly a left back, he can also play as a left winger.

International career

Rovegno was first called up to the Gibraltar senior team in May 2015 for matches against Croatia and Germany. He made his international début with Gibraltar on 7 June 2015 in a 0-4 loss with Croatia.

International statistics

.

References

External links

1989 births
Living people
Gibraltarian footballers
Gibraltar international footballers
Association football defenders
F.C. Boca Gibraltar players
Gibraltar United F.C. players
Glacis United F.C. players
Lions Gibraltar F.C. players
Manchester 62 F.C. players
St Joseph's F.C. players
Gibraltar Premier Division players